Ethnophilosophy is the study of indigenous philosophical systems. The implicit concept is that a specific culture can have a philosophy that is not applicable and accessible to all peoples and cultures in the world; however, this concept is disputed by traditional philosophers.

References

Ethnic studies
Applied philosophy